Faddis is a surname. Notable people with the surname include:

Charles I. Faddis (1890–1972), American politician
Jon Faddis (born 1953), American jazz trumpet player, conductor, composer, and educator

See also
Addis (name)
Gaddis (surname)